Noël Koumba Koussey is a Beninois politician and diplomat.

Biogrpahy
An opponent of the Kérékou regime, he participated in the struggles for multi-party democracy in Benin. In 1990 he was a member of the politburo of the Communist Party of Dahomey (from 1993, the Communist Party of Benin CPB).  In the 1995 general election, he was elected as a representative of the CPB and served as a Deputy in the National Assembly from April 1995 to April 1999.

He served as ambassador to Niger, with additional jurisdiction for Mali and Burkina Faso, until August 2020.

References

Year of birth missing (living people)
Living people
Communist Party of Benin politicians
Place of birth missing (living people)

Hoxhaists
Anti-revisionists